Plasmodium uilenbergi is a parasite of the genus Plasmodium subgenus Vinckeia. As in all Plasmodium species, P. uilenbergi has both vertebrate and insect hosts. The vertebrate hosts for this parasite are mammals.

Taxonomy 
The parasite was first described by Landau et al. in 1989.

Description 
The infected erythrocyte becomes enlarged.

Distribution 
This species is found in Madagascar.

Hosts 
The only known host is the lemur Lemur fulvus fulvus.

References 

uilenbergi